Dancing Cat Records is a record label founded in 1983 by pianist George Winston to publish both his music and music in the Hawaiian slack-key guitar style. Its mission later expanded to cover other Hawaiian musicians. Dancing Cat's albums were originally distributed by Windham Hill Records. Since Windham Hill's buyout by Sony Music Entertainment in 2008, the label receives distribution from RCA Victor, but is not owned by Windham Hill or Sony Music.

Artists
Keola Beamer
Bob Brozman
Sonny Chillingworth
Ledward Kaapana
Dennis Kamakahi
Ray Kane
Silvia Kohan
Leonard Kwan
Michael Lorimer
Professor Longhair
Cyril Pahinui
Bola Sete
Shad Weathersby
George Winston

See also 
 List of record labels

External links
 Official site

American record labels
Record labels established in 1983